Charles Jackson (March 4, 1797January 21, 1876) was the 18th Governor of Rhode Island from 1845 to 1846.

Early life
Jackson was born in Providence, Rhode Island, on March 4, 1797, and was the son of Richard Jackson, Jr. He graduated from Brown University in 1817, and received a master's degree in 1820.  He also studied law with James Burrill, Jr., and was admitted to the bar in 1820.

Business career
In addition to practicing law, Jackson was involved in several businesses, including a cotton manufacturing company.  He also built a rubber factory after acquiring patent rights from Charles Goodyear.  Jackson's ventures proved successful, and he later expanded into firearms as operator of the Burnside Rifle Works and a company that manufactured railroad equipment.

Political career
Jackson was active in politics as a Whig, served several terms in the Rhode Island House of Representatives, and was Speaker from 1841 to 1842.  In 1843 he was a delegate to the state constitutional convention.

Jackson served as governor from 1845 to 1846, after defeating incumbent James Fenner.  He was elected as a Whig identified with the Liberation movement, which advocated freedom for those imprisoned as a result of the Dorr Rebellion.  Jackson signed a bill freeing rebellion leader Thomas Wilson Dorr and all others who had been convicted.  In response, Whig opponents of freeing Dorr organized a "Law & Order Party." Jackson was nominated for governor by the Democrats, and was defeated by Lieutenant Governor Byron Diman.

In 1857 Jackson was an unsuccessful candidate for the United States Senate.

Death and burial
Jackson died in Providence on January 21, 1876.  He was buried at North Burial Ground in Providence.

Family
Jackson was married twice.  His first wife was Catherine Dexter (1805-1832), whom he married in 1827.  In 1836 he married Phebe Tisdale (died March 3, 1883) of Scituate, Rhode Island.  He had seven children, five of whom lived to adulthood.

References

External links
Charles Jackson at National Governors Association

Charles Jackson (1797-1876) at The Political Graveyard

|-

1797 births
1876 deaths
Politicians from Providence, Rhode Island
Rhode Island lawyers
19th-century American businesspeople
Governors of Rhode Island
Speakers of the Rhode Island House of Representatives
Democratic Party members of the Rhode Island House of Representatives
Brown University alumni
Rhode Island Whigs
Dorr Rebellion
Burials at North Burying Ground (Providence)
Whig Party state governors of the United States
19th-century American politicians
19th-century American lawyers